Pedda Shapur also Peddashapur is a village in Ranga Reddy district in Telangana, India. It falls under Shamshabad mandal.

References

Villages in Ranga Reddy district